Unhallowed Ground may refer to:

 Unhallowed ground, ground that has not been hallowed, or consecrated
Unconsecrated parts of a cemetery
 Unhallowed Ground, a 2015 British independent horror film 
 "Unhallowed Ground", a song by Midnight Syndicate from the 2002 album Vampyre

See also
 Hallowed Ground (disambiguation)
 Unhallowed (disambiguation)